Proffitt is a surname. Notable people with the name include:

Ethel Maude Proffitt Stephenson (née Ethel Maude Proffitt) (1895—1982), American lawyer
Frank Proffitt (1913–1965), Appalachian old-time banjoist and performer
Paine Proffitt (born 1972), American-born artist living in England
Shane Profitt, American musician
Stanley Proffitt (1910–1999), English cricketer
Steve Proffitt, American radio journalist

See also
Proffitt's, Department store chain based in Alcoa, Tennessee
Thacher Proffitt & Wood LLP, American law firm headquartered in New York City